Arabigere 85  is a village in the southern state of Karnataka, India. It is located in the Kollegal taluk of Chamarajanagar district in Karnataka.

Demographics
 India census, Arabigere 85 had a population of 5157 with 2606 males and 2551 females.

See also
 Chamarajanagar
 Districts of Karnataka

References

External links
 http://Chamarajanagar.nic.in/

Villages in Chamarajanagar district